The Tolley & Company Warehouse, also known as the Tolley Bond Store and the Tolley & Company Building, is a heritage building located at 1 Pakenham Street in the Fremantle West End Heritage area. It dates from the gold rush boom period in the late nineteenth and early twentieth centuries, and is of historic significance.

The building was constructed in 1897 for Tolley & Co., wine and spirit merchants, who remained in the same building until 1911.

The Federation free classical style three storey rendered building includes a half basement below street level. The building façade has a parapet with spherical decorative elements above the engaged pilasters. It features a decorative pediment with pilasters rusticated to the first floor. The name "Tolley & Compy. Limited Merchants" appears in stucco across the alley way entrance to the courtyard at the rear of the building on the right side of the building.

The architect for the building was Herbert Nathaniel Davis, who was responsible for many buildings in and around Fremantle, including the Esplanade Hotel, Union Stores Building, Lilly's Building and Cliff Street Chambers.

The building also has a  paved courtyard at the rear.

See also
 List of heritage places in Fremantle

References

1897 establishments in Australia
Fremantle West End Heritage area
State Register of Heritage Places in the City of Fremantle